Phacops fecundus  is a species of trilobite from the lower Devonian period. Their fossils are found in the Czech Republic.

Subspecies
 Phacops fecundus fecundus Barrande† 
 Phacops fecundus major Barrande†

References

Biolib
Paleobiology Database
University of Bristol

Phacopidae
Devonian trilobites of Europe
Taxa named by Joachim Barrande